Charlie Vaughan may refer to:
Charlie Vaughan (baseball) (born 1947), Major League Baseball pitcher during the 1960s for the Atlanta Braves
Charlie Vaughan (footballer), English forward from the 1940s and 1950s who played for Charlton Athletic and Portsmouth

See also 
 Charles Vaughan (disambiguation)